Edgar Percival Aircraft Limited was a British aircraft manufacturer from 1954 to 1958. The company was based at Stapleford Aerodrome, England.

History
In 1954, Edgar Percival formed Edgar Percival Aircraft Limited a few years after his original company the Percival Aircraft Company had become part of the Hunting Group. His first new design was Edgar Percival E.P.9 which was a utility aircraft designed for agricultural use.

In 1958 Samlesbury Engineering Ltd Limited acquired rights to the design and the company formed a subsidiary named the Lancashire Aircraft Company Limited.

Aircraft
 Edgar Percival E.P.9

References

Defunct aircraft manufacturers of the United Kingdom
Defunct aircraft manufacturers of England
British companies established in 1954
Manufacturing companies established in 1954
Manufacturing companies disestablished in 1958
1954 establishments in England
1958 disestablishments in England